The Loop line of Chongqing Rail Transit is a rapid transit loop line in Chongqing, China. The line is also known as Line 0.

The metro line serves three major railway stations in Chongqing: Chongqing North railway station, Shapingba railway station, and Chongqing West railway station.

History 
The line began construction on October 28, 2013.

The northeastern section was opened on December 28, 2018. The southern section with the Egongyan Rail Transit Bridge opened on December 30, 2019. The remaining section opened on January 20, 2021.

Opening timeline

Stations

Accident
On January 8, 2019, a train accident occurred in the tunnel between Haixialu and Nanhu where a train struck an improperly opened and secured safety shield. As a result, one person was killed and three people were injured.

References

 
2018 establishments in China
Railway lines opened in 2018
Railway loop lines